Mura is a surname. Notable people with the surname include:

 Andrea Mura (born 1964), Italian politician
 Corinna Mura (1910–1965). American cabaret singer
 David Mura (born 1952), Japanese-American author, poet, novelist, playwright, critic and performance artist
 Éric Mura (born 1963), French retired footballer
 Facundo Mura (born 1999), Argentine footballer 
 Frank Mura (1861–?), French-born American painter and water colourist
 Gambhir Singh Mura (1930–2002), Indian tribal dancer 
 Gianni Mura (1945–2020), Italian sports journalist 
 Giuseppe Mura (born 1943), Italian boxer
 Roberto Mura (born 1955), Italian politician and businessman
 Steve Mura (born 1955), American baseball player
 Takahito Mura (born 1991), Japanese figure skater
 Takashi Mura (born 1960), Japanese figure skater
 Toshio Mura (1925–2009), professor of engineering

See also
Miura (surname)
LaMura, surname

Italian-language surnames
Japanese-language surnames